Charles Hunter Brown (1825–1898) was a New Zealand politician from Canterbury, New Zealand.

He represented Christchurch Country in the 2nd Parliament in 1860 from 21 April to 5 November, but was defeated when he then stood for the Cheviot electorate in North Canterbury in the 1861 election.

References

1825 births
1898 deaths
Members of the New Zealand House of Representatives
New Zealand MPs for South Island electorates
Unsuccessful candidates in the 1860–1861 New Zealand general election
19th-century New Zealand politicians